Elizabeth LaPensée is an assistant professor in the Departments of Media & Information and Writing, Rhetoric, & American Cultures at Michigan State University. She is of Irish, Anishinaabe, and Métis descent. She studies and creates video games, interactive digital media, animation, visual art, and comics to express Indigenous ways of knowing. Her mother is Grace Dillon, a professor at Portland State University.

Education 
LaPensée received her PhD from Simon Fraser University. Her dissertation was on the benefits of playing Survivance— a social impact game that uplifts storytelling, art, and self-determination as a pathway to healing from Indigenous historical trauma.

Indigenous Game Design 
LaPensée designs games around Indigenous ways of knowing. Active as a community organizer, she often collaborates with community partners to create games. She argues that Indigenous practices and teachings can inspire innovative game mechanics. Her games provide an interactive way of engaging with and continuing on Indigenous cultures and history. Her game Honour Water (2016) is a singing-game that teaches Anishinaabe water songs.
In 2014, LaPensée spoke out against a remake of Custer's Revenge, a controversial game that allows the player, as General Custer, to rape a Native woman.

LaPensée's game Invaders was featured in the 2015 ImagineNATIVE Film + Media Arts Festival in Toronto.

She organized the first Natives in Game Development Gathering at the University of California, Santa Cruz, in May 2015.

Indigenous Futurism 

Elizabeth LaPensée's research is often cited in connection with Indigenous Futurisms. She was an early research assistant with Aboriginal Territories in Cyberspace (AbTeC) and research affiliate with the Initiative for Indigenous Futures (IIF). Her mother, scholar Grace Dillon, describes LaPensée's sci-fi animations as a "must-see" example of how Indigenous storytelling can transform the way Indigenous futures are imagined. Kristina Baudemann argues that LaPensée, despite being perceived as a white woman, retains an ability to draw on her Metis ancestry to create new representations of actual Indigenous people.

Awards 
In 2017, LaPensée received the Serious Games Community Leadership Award from the Serious Games Special Interest Group of the International Game Developers Association and she was named one of Motherboard's Humans of the Year, a series of profiles recognizing people in science and technology who are building a better future for everyone. Her game Thunderbird Strike won the prize for Best Digital Media Work at the 2017 ImagineNATIVE Film + Media Arts Festival.

In April 2018, LaPensée was selected as a Guggenheim Fellow in the fine arts category. When Rivers Were Trails was awarded Best Adaptation at IndieCade 2019.

Works

Games
Weird West (2022)
When Rivers Were Trails (2019)
Dialect (2017)
Thunderbird Strike (2017)
 Coyote Quest (2017)
 Manoominike (2017)
 Mikan (2017)
 Honour Water (2016)
 Little Earth Strong (2016)
 Singuistics: Anishinaabemowin (2016)
 Invaders (2015) (with Trevino Brings Plenty and Steven Paul Judd)
 Ninagamomin ji-nanaandawi'iwe (2015)
 The Gift of Food (2014)
 Gathering Native Foods (2014)
 Max's Adventure (2013)
 Mawisowin (2012)
 Survivance (2011)
 Techno Medicine Wheel (2008)
 Venture Arctic (2007)

References 

Living people
Simon Fraser University alumni
Michigan State University faculty
Year of birth missing (living people)